Scopula ansorgei is a moth of the family Geometridae. It was described by Warren in 1899. It is found in Uganda.

References

Moths described in 1899
ansorgei
Moths of Africa
Insects of Uganda
Endemic fauna of Uganda
Taxa named by William Warren (entomologist)